Steinbach is a river of Bavaria, Germany and of Salzburg, Austria. It is a tributary of the Saalach between Unken and Schneizlreuth.

See also
List of rivers of Bavaria

References

Rivers of Bavaria
Rivers of Salzburg (state)
International rivers of Europe
Austria–Germany border
Rivers of Austria
Rivers of Germany
Border rivers